The Men's Individual Pursuit was one of the 10 men's events at the 2007 UCI Track World Championships, held in Palma de Mallorca, Spain on March 29.

Twenty-two cyclists from 14 countries participated in the contest. After the qualification, the two fastest riders advance to the final and the 3rd- and 4th-best results would race for the bronze medal.

The qualification took place on March 29 at 10:45 a.m. and the finals on the same day at 8:05 p.m.

World record

Qualifying

Finals

References

Men's individual pursuit
UCI Track Cycling World Championships – Men's individual pursuit